The Bryan brothers, identical twin brothers Bob Bryan and Mike Bryan, are retired American professional doubles tennis players and the most successful duo of all time. They were born on April 29, 1978, with Mike being the elder by two minutes. The Bryans have won multiple Olympic medals, including the gold in 2012 and have won more professional games, matches, tournaments and Grand Slams than any other men's pairing. They held the World No. 1 doubles ranking jointly for 438 weeks (Mike has been ranked Men's Doubles World No. 1 for a total of 506 weeks), which is longer than anyone else in doubles history, and have also enjoyed that World No. 1 ranking together for a record 139 consecutive weeks. They have finished as the ATP year-end number 1 doubles team a record 10 times. Between 2005 and 2006, they set an Open Era record by competing in seven consecutive men's doubles Grand Slam finals.

They are also well known for celebrating winning points by chest-bumping each other. Some of their success is attributed to their particular brand of twinship: the Bryans are "mirror twins", where one is right-handed (Mike) and the other left-handed (Bob). This is advantageous for their court coverage. They were coached by David Macpherson between 2005 and 2016. In January 2017 they reunited with coach Phil Farmer, who previously trained them to their first grand slam title, the French Open men's doubles. In October of 2017, Macpherson and Dr. Dave Marshall Ph. D. assumed coaching duties, with Marshall handling day-to-day responsibilities, until the duo retired. 

Turning pro in 1998, the brothers retired in August 2020, having played (and won) their final match as a team in March of that year.

Records and achievements

On October 28, 2016, they recorded their all-time record 1000th match win, as a team, by defeating Pablo Cuevas and Viktor Troicki in the quarter finals of the 2016 Erste Bank Open, in Vienna, Austria. Following their triumph at the 2013 Wimbledon Championships, the Bryans became the only doubles pairing in the Open Era to hold all four major titles at once (but not in a single season). They also won Olympic Gold during this period. They are also the only doubles team in history to have won every major title, having won all four Grand Slams, Olympic Gold, every (12 versions of the 9 tournaments) ATP World Tour Masters 1000 title, the ATP World Tour Finals and the Davis Cup during their careers.

The two have won a record 119 tour titles, surpassing The Woodies (Todd Woodbridge and Mark Woodforde) who won 61, and have been finalists on 59 other occasions. They have a career "Super Slam" and 16 Grand Slam titles overall, which is more than any men's team in the Open Era. These include victories at the Australian Open (2006, 2007, 2009, 2010, 2011 and 2013), the French Open (2003, 2013), Wimbledon (2006, 2011, 2013), and the US Open (2005, 2008, 2010, 2012 and 2014). They are the only doubles pairing in history to have completed the "Double Career Grand Slam", having won all four Grand Slam titles at least twice as a team. They won the ATP World Tour Finals doubles tournament four times (2003, 2004, 2009 and 2014).

They won the gold medal at the 2012 Summer Olympics in London and the bronze medal at the 2008 Beijing Olympics. They won the 2007 Davis Cup, along with Andy Roddick and James Blake. The brothers were named ATP Team of the Decade for 2000–2009 and for 2010–2019.

The twins were part of the United States Davis Cup team, with a 25–5 record in doubles matches, the most wins ever by a USA doubles team. Both brothers have played Davis Cup singles matches (Bob is 4–2 and Mike is 0–1).

Doubles records
These records were attained in the Open Era of tennis.
Records in bold indicate peer-less achievements.

Professional awards
 ITF World Champion: 2003, 2004, 2005, 2006, 2007, 2009, 2010, 2011, 2012, 2013, 2014
 ATP World Tour Fans' Favorite Team: 2005, 2006, 2007, 2008, 2009, 2010, 2011, 2012, 2013, 2014, 2015, 2016, 2017, 2018 Mike with Jack Sock, 2019
 Arthur Ashe Humanitarian of the Year: 2015

Other achievements
 Played in front of the second largest crowd, at an official match, in tennis history (27,200 at the Davis Cup final in Seville, Spain – December 4, 2004)
 Won a record 25 Davis Cup World Group matches for the United States
 Davis Cup Commitment Award

Junior career
Bob and Mike won their first doubles tournament at age 6, in a 10-and-under event. They attended Mesa Union School (Somis, California) for elementary and junior high school, then Rio Mesa High School in Oxnard, California. They had an outstanding junior career, winning well over a hundred junior doubles titles together. They won the 1991 USTA National Boys' 14 Doubles Championships, the 1992 USTA National Boys' 14 Clay Court doubles title, the 1994 USTA National Boys' 16 Clay Court doubles title, the 1995 USTA National Boys' 18 Clay Courts doubles title, the 1995 USTA National Boys' 18 doubles title, and the first-ever Easter Bowl boys' 18 doubles title. The duo won four consecutive doubles titles at the Ojai Tennis Tournament from 1993 to 1996, including twice in the boys' 16s and twice in the CIF Interscholastic division.

The brothers won the USTA National Boys' 18 Clay Court Championships again in 1996, becoming the first team in 30 years to repeat as doubles champions at that event. Bob and Mike became the first repeat doubles champions in 50 years at the 1996 USTA National Boys' 18 Championships in Kalamazoo, Michigan, defeating Michael Russell and Kevin Kim in the final. The Bryans then won the 1996 US Open junior boys' doubles title, defeating Daniele Bracciali of Italy and Jocelyn Robichaud of Canada 5–7, 6–3, 6–4 in the final. They won the bronze medal in men's doubles at the 1999 Pan American Games held in Winnipeg, Manitoba, Canada, where they represented the United States for the first time as professionals. 

Both were awarded full-ride tennis scholarships to Stanford University in fall 1996, and played there through 1998, helping the team to an NCAA team title both years. They won the NCAA doubles title in 1998, defeating Kelly Gullet and Robert Lindstedt of Pepperdine University in the final, becoming the first brothers to win the NCAA doubles title since Robert and Tom Falkenberg of USC in 1946. They finished the year ranked No. 1 in the collegiate doubles rankings.

Professional career

Early career

The Bryans made their Grand Slam debut at the 1995 US Open, where they lost in the first round to Grant Connell and Patrick Galbraith. Their first tour win came in 1998, at the ATP Washington, D.C. and won two Challenger tournaments, at Aptos and Burbank.

In 1999, the twins reached their first ATP final at Orlando, falling in the finals to Jim Courier and Todd Woodbridge. They reached the semi-finals at Scottsdale, and the quarter-finals at Indian Wells and Key Biscayne. The brothers were successful on the Challenger Circuit, winning three tournaments (Amarillo, Birmingham, Burbank), and reaching the finals in four others.

The next season saw the brothers win their first match at a Grand Slam when they reached the quarter-finals of the US Open (1st round, beat David Adams and John-Laffnie de Jager). They reached three ATP semi-finals (San Jose, Orlando, Newport), and two other quarter-finals (Queen's Club, Washington, D.C.). On the Challenger Circuit they won the title at Aptos and were losing finalists at San Antonio, Burbank and Rancho Mirage. 

The brothers have only played each other in three professionally recognized matches, once each in 1998, 1999, and 2000, playing at U.S.A. F12, Hong Kong, and Armonk, respectively. Mike leads the series 2–1, coming back after losing to Bob in the 1998 match. Each match was played in the Best of Three Sets format, and each was won in straight sets. The ATP classified all three of these matches as "Qualifying, Challenger And Futures Matches," meaning they do not count towards their overall singles records, but the matches were still recorded. Bob won the first match 6–4, 6–3; Mike won the second and third matches 6–4, 6–4, and 6–3, 6–4, respectively.

2001–2002: First titles and Slam semifinals
2001 was the first really successful season for the Bryans as they captured four titles (Memphis, Queen's Club, Newport, Los Angeles) in five finals (were finalists at Washington losing to Martin Damm and David Prinosil). The first ATP doubles title came at Memphis, by defeating Alex O'Brien and Jonathan Stark in the final. They became the first brothers combination to win four titles in a season (Tim and Tom Gullikson won three in 1978 and 1982). They reached their first Grand Slam semi-final at Wimbledon and finished the year at No. 7 in the ATP Doubles Race, with a 45–23 match record.

The next season saw the Bryans win a career-high five ATP doubles titles, including their first ATP Masters Series title. They won that AMS title at Toronto, where they beat Mark Knowles and Daniel Nestor in the final. They won titles at Acapulco, Scottsdale, Newport, and Basel, and were runners-up at Adelaide, Memphis and Washington. They advanced to the semi-finals at Wimbledon for the second straight year.  Also, the brothers reached the semi-finals at the US Open (where they lost to Mahesh Bhupathi/Max Mirnyi), Washington, and the Madrid Masters. They finished the season with a 54–19 match record and in third place in the doubles race. The brothers faced each other at the US Open mixed doubles final, with Mike and Lisa Raymond defeating Bob and Katarina Srebotnik.

2003–2006: Breakthrough and dominance
2003 was a landmark season for the Bryans. They reached their first Grand Slam final at Roland Garros, where they also won their first Grand Slam title, beating Paul Haarhuis and Yevgeny Kafelnikov in the final, and did not drop a set all through the tournament. They won five titles for the second successive year (Barcelona, Roland Garros, Nottingham, Cincinnati Masters, Tennis Masters Cup).

With their win at Roland Garros, the Bryans set the record for most doubles titles by a brothers team, breaking Tim and Tom Gullikson's mark of 10. They reached the finals of three other tournaments, including the US Open, became the first brothers duo to finish number 1 in the ATP race, and closed the season by winning the title at Tennis Masters Cup, Houston. They also made their Davis Cup debut' for the United States in 2003, in the World Group Playoff tie in Slovak Republic, beating Karol Beck/Dominik Hrbatý in straight sets and helping the US to a 3–2 victory. 

In 2004, they won a career-best seven titles, the victories coming at Adelaide, Memphis, Acapulco, Queen's Club, Los Angeles, Basel and Tennis Masters Cup Houston. They also reached four other finals. They were part of the US Tennis Team at the Athens Olympics in 2004, where they lost in the quarter-finals to eventual gold medalists Fernando González and Nicolás Massú of Chile. They finished another successful season by winning the Tennis Masters Cup for the second year running.

In 2005, the Bryans reached all four Grand Slam finals, and though they lost in the first three (Australian Open, Roland Garros and Wimbledon), they won the second Grand Slam of their career at the US Open in front of cheering home fans. They also won tournaments at Scottsdale, Queen's Club and Washington, and made it to the finals at Memphis, Monte Carlo TMS and Rome TMS. In 2006, the twins won the first Grand Slam of the season, the 2006 Australian Open, where they beat Leander Paes of India and Martin Damm of the Czech Republic in the final. They completed the career slam a few months later at Wimbledon, beating Fabrice Santoro and Nenad Zimonjić in four sets in the final.

2007: Davis Cup Champions
2007 saw the Bryans win 11 titles. They started losing in the first round of their first tournament, but entered the 2007 Australian Open and won it defeating Jonas Björkman and Max Mirnyi in the final. Björkman and Mirnyi had defeated the Bryans for two years running in the French Open finals. The brothers only lost one set. Their second title of the season came in Las Vegas where the outstanding team beat Jonathan Erlich/Andy Ram. At the 2007 Miami Masters, the twins won the Masters Series title, defeating Martin Damm and Leander Paes. Their fourth title came without a set's loss in Houston, defeating Mark Knowles and Daniel Nestor in the final. The pair won their fifth title on the 2007 ATP Tour and second Masters Series title of the year at the Monte-Carlo Masters- they missed Indian Wells. The team defeated Julien Benneteau and Nicolas Mahut in the final. At the Rome Masters, however, the brothers lost to Fabrice Santoro and Nenad Zimonjić. It was the first Masters Series match that the Bryans lost in 2007. 

The Hamburg Masters saw the Bryans beat Paul Hanley and Kevin Ullyett in the final for a sixth title on the 2007 ATP Tour and third Masters Series event of the year. The brothers lost to Lukáš Dlouhý and Pavel Vízner at the 2007 French Open and to Knowles and Nestor at Queen's Club. They lost in the Wimbledon finals to Arnaud Clément and Michaël Llodra, but did avenge Dlouhý/Vízner in the quarter-finals and Santoro/Zimonjić in the semi-finals. The seventh title of their season came in Los Angeles when the tandem defeated Scott Lipsky and David Martin in the final. In Washington, D.C., the team defeated Erlich/Ram in the final. The brothers did not reach the finals in the 2007 Rogers Masters, which is the second time that the Bryans did not reach a 2007 Masters Series final. They lost in the finals of the 2007 Cincinnati Masters to Erlich/Ram and their next event was the 2007 US Open, which the brothers lost in the quarter-finals to Simon Aspelin and Julian Knowle. Each brother lost in the second round of mixed doubles competition. The brothers' ninth title came at the 2007 Madrid Masters, beating Mariusz Fyrstenberg and Marcin Matkowski in the final. Their tenth title of the season came in Basel, where they beat James Blake and Mark Knowles. The brothers won their eleventh title in 2007 at the 2007 Paris Masters, defeating second seeds Daniel Nestor and Nenad Zimonjić in the final. 

The Bryans earned the No. 1 spot in the ATP doubles race and thus were entered into the 2007 Tennis Masters Cup. However, Mike had an elbow injury and could not compete.

The brothers won the third rubber in the 2007 Davis Cup finals, defeating Igor Andreev and Nikolay Davydenko of Russia, thereby clinching the Davis Cup title over the country that was the reigning title holder. Andy Roddick prevailed over Dmitry Tursunov and James Blake defeated Mikhail Youzhny. Bob lost his first Davis Cup singles match in the 4th dead rubber, falling to Andreev; and Blake defeated Tursunov in the 5th dead rubber to end the tie at 4–1.  Thus, the United States earned its record 32nd title.

2008
The brothers started their season on the 2008 ATP Tour by entering the 2008 Medibank International in Sydney. They survived a quarter-final match against Jonathan Erlich and Andy Ram and later entered the final, falling to Richard Gasquet and Jo-Wilfried Tsonga. The Bryans again made a good appearance at the 2008 Australian Open. The team breezed through their first three rounds before losing to Mahesh Bhupathi and Mark Knowles. Soon afterwards, the Bryans beat Austria's Julian Knowle and Jürgen Melzer in the first round of the 2008 Davis Cup. Mike had to retire against Stefan Koubek in singles, while Bob Bryan defeated Werner Eschauer in three sets for the US to win the tie. 

The Bryans lost to Max Mirnyi and Jamie Murray in the 2008 Delray Beach International Tennis Championships final, and to fellow Stanford Alumni Scott Lipsky and David Martin in the final of the 2008 SAP Open in San Jose, California. The Bryans made it to the final of the Tennis Channel Open in Las Vegas, producing wins over Xavier Malisse and Hugo Armando, Chris Guccione and Lleyton Hewitt, and Marcos Baghdatis and Konstantinos Economidis, but went down in the final to Julien Benneteau and Michaël Llodra. The brothers lost in the quarter-finals of the 2008 Indian Wells Masters to Mirnyi and Murray once more. 

The brothers captured their first title of the season at the 2008 Miami Masters, beating Bhupathi and Knowles. After this, they lost in their Davis Cup match to Arnaud Clément and Llodra. They lost to Jeff Coetzee and Wesley Moodie at the 2008 Monte-Carlo Masters, however, they then claimed a second title on the 2008 ATP Tour in Barcelona at the 2008 Torneo Godó, beating Mariusz Fyrstenberg and Marcin Matkowski to win the final. At the Rome Masters, they beat Daniel Nestor and Nenad Zimonjić to claim the title. This made the Indian Wells Masters as the only ATP Masters Series to have escaped them. 

The brothers moved on to the 2008 Hamburg Masters, where they only lost one set before reaching the final. However, Nestor and Zimonjić claimed the title. Then, two weeks later, the brothers entered the 2008 French Open. Their second Grand Slam of the year looked to be a strong one, however they fell to Pablo Cuevas and Luis Horna in the quarter-finals. Again, they lost at the 2008 Queen's Club Championships to Marcelo Melo and André Sá, whom they had beaten in Hamburg. Another Grand Slam setback occurred for them at the 2008 Wimbledon Championships, when the twins lost in the semi-finals in a tight match against Jonas Björkman and Kevin Ullyett. They played opposite each other at the Wimbledon mixed doubles final. Bob and Samantha Stosur defeated Mike and Katarina Srebotnik. The brothers played their way into tournaments, as they reached the final of the 2008 Canada Masters, where they lost to Nestor and Zimonjić. Their losses ended at the 2008 Cincinnati Masters, when they came from behind to beat Bhupathi and Knowles. They won the title with a comeback against Israel's Erlich and Ram, earning themselves two successive wins coming back from the loss of the first set. 

The brothers combined at the 2008 Beijing Olympics. After losing to singles specialists and eventual gold medalists Roger Federer and Stanislas Wawrinka, they beat Clément and Llodra 3–6, 6–3, 6–4 to win the bronze medal. The brothers did not appear again until the 2008 US Open, where they won the title. They then lost in the quarter-finals of the 2008 Madrid Masters to Björkman and Ullyett. At the 2008 Tennis Masters Cup in Shanghai, they reached the final, only to be defeated by Nestor and Zimonjić and so to lose their positions as world Number 1s for the first time in three years.

2009
In January, the brothers entered the Medibank International, in Sydney, Australia, defeating Simone Bolelli and Andreas Seppi, and in the quarter-final, Tommy Robredo and Feliciano López in straight sets. They survived a semi-final match against Mahesh Bhupathi and Mark Knowles. They avenged their Tennis Masters Cup doubles final loss with a win over Daniel Nestor and Nenad Zimonjić to win their first Medibank International doubles title in 10 years. At the season's first Grand Slam, in Melbourne, the Australian Open, the brothers won the men's Doubles final, on Saturday, January 31, defeating India's Mahesh Bhupathi and Mark Knowles from the Bahamas in three sets. The outcome was historical in that it was the first time in tennis history that siblings had won both categories of Doubles titles – men's and women's – at a Major, as Venus and Serena Williams had won the Women's Doubles title at the Australian Open the previous night. At the Delray Beach International Tennis Championships, they defeated second seeds Marcelo Melo and André Sá for their third title of the year and to win the tournament for the first time ever. 

The broke the US record for most wins in Davis Cup doubles as a pair with 15 wins when they beat the Swiss team of Stanislas Wawrinka and Yves Allegro in the 2009 Davis Cup 1st round. Mike Bryan got one more win in Davis cup doubles (total 16) with Mardy Fish when his brother Bob was out of play due to injury in the 2008 semi-finals. At the U.S. Men's Clay Court Championships in Houston, they beat fellow Americans Jesse Levine and Ryan Sweeting to win their fourth title of the year. At the Barcelona Open Banco Sabadell and Internazionali BNL d'Italia, they failed to defend their titles as they lost to Bhupathi and Knowles and to Nestor and Zimonjic in the semi-finals and final respectively. They exited the French Open in the semi-finals to South African-Belgian pair Wesley Moodie and Dick Norman after losing three match points. They were seeded first at Wimbledon, where they reached the final without dropping a set. however, they lost the final against arch-rivals Nestor and Zimonjic in four sets. They started their US Open Series and North American hard-court season by winning the LA Tennis Open over Benjamin Becker and Frank Moser of Germany. They were the defending champions at the 2009 US Open and lost in the quarter-finals to Lukáš Dlouhý and Leander Paes in a re-match of the 2008 final despite saving five match points. 

The brothers won their next ATP World Tour 500 title in Beijing. The next week, they competed at the eighth Masters 1000 tournament of the year, the Shanghai Masters, but lost in the quarter-finals. They then competed in Basel as a warm-up tournament before Paris and London. They reached the final but lost to Daniel Nestor and Nenad Zimonjić. At Paris, they lost at the quarter-finals. However, they captured the Barclays ATP World Tour Finals to end the year as the World No. 1 Doubles Team for the fifth time and capture the Year-end championships for the third time. The year 2009 was the first year since 2004 where the brothers did not win any ATP World Tour Masters 1000 tournaments.

2010
The brothers began 2010 playing at the 2010 Heineken Open in Auckland. However, the pair lost in the first round. They then went on successfully defending their title at the 2010 Australian Open, beating Daniel Nestor and Nenad Zimonjić in the final, thus claiming their fourth Australian Open title and eighth major title. They also defended their titles at the 2010 Delray Beach International Tennis Championships (where they earned their 600th victory as a team) and the U.S. Men's Clay Court Championships in Houston. The brothers participated in the first round of Davis Cup, where they were drawn to face Serbia in Belgrade on clay courts. Mike had to withdraw due to food poisoning and was replaced by John Isner. Bob and Isner won the doubles rubber in five sets against Janko Tipsarević and Zimonjić. However, the US lost the tie 3–2 (with the last rubber being a dead rubber). The brothers then won two back to back Masters Series titles during the European clay tour at the 2010 Internazionali BNL d'Italia in Rome and the 2010 Mutua Madrileña Madrid Open. They defeated compatriots Isner and Sam Querrey in Rome, and co-world No. 1s Nestor and Zimonjić in Madrid. This ended their ATP World Tour Masters 1000 title drought since August 2008 and equalled The Woodies' record of 61 doubles titles.

Seeded first at the 2010 French Open, the Bryans suffered their earliest exit at a Grand Slam since the 2001 US Open by losing to Marcelo Melo and Bruno Soares in the second round. They did not compete in any of the warm-up tournaments before Wimbledon. At Wimbledon, however, the defending champions Nestor and Zimonjić made an early exit, creating the possibility for the brothers to regain the No. 1 doubles teaming, but lost to Wesley Moodie and Dick Norman in the quarter-finals.

To start their 2010 North American summer hard-court swing, the brothers won their 62nd career doubles title at their hometown tournament in Los Angeles, where they were the defending champions. They reached the final and became the first team in the Open Era to reach 100 doubles finals. The win surpassed the Woodies record of 61 wins as a team. Their next target is the all-time record of 79 set by Pam Shriver and Martina Navratilova. They next participated in the 2010 Legg Mason Tennis Classic in Washington, D.C., where they lost in the quarter-finals to Rohan Bopanna and Aisam-ul-Haq Qureshi.

The brothers continued their ATP World Tour Masters 1000 winning streak by capturing their 63rd title at the 2010 Rogers Cup in Toronto, adding to their titles in 2002 and 2006 and their 64th title at the 2010 Western & Southern Financial Group Masters in Cincinnati, adding to their titles in 2003 and 2008. This ensured their return to the No. 1 spot in the team rankings. This marked their wins in four consecutive Masters 1000 tournaments. Their winning streak continued as they won the 2010 US Open, giving the brothers a ninth major title, just two shy from the Woodies, by beating Bopanna and Qureshi in the final. On September 6, 2010, they were ranked number one in doubles based on the ATP ranking system for 205 weeks, surpassing Todd Woodbridge's previous record of 204 weeks. 

Playing in the 2010 China Open in Beijing to start their Asian hard-court swing, their first tournament after their Flushing Meadows victory, they extended their winning streak to 18–0 with a victory in the final over Mariusz Fyrstenberg and Marcin Matkowski. It was noted that they won their tenth title of the season on October 10, 2010. After this successful title defense, their next tournament was the 2010 Shanghai Rolex Masters where their winning streak ended at 20 after losing to Jürgen Melzer and Leander Paes in the semi-finals. The Bryans then participated at the 2010 Davidoff Swiss Indoors where the clinched the year-end no.1 ranking by reaching the semi-finals. They ended up winning their 11th title of the year in their 11th final by beating defending champions Nestor and Zimonjić in the final. They capped up their season by losing to Mark Knowles and Andy Ram in the semi-finals of the 2010 BNP Paribas Masters in Paris, and to Nestor and Zimonjić in the Barclays ATP World Tour Finals.

2011
The brothers began 2011 at the 2011 Medibank International Sydney where they reached the final. The pair lost to first-time pairing of Lukáš Dlouhý and Paul Hanley, marking their first final loss since March 2008 to a team other than Nestor/Zimonjic. They next traveled to Melbourne and successfully defended their 2011 Australian Open title, beating Indian duo Mahesh Bhupathi and Leander Paes in the final. This was the Bryans' third straight title at the Australian Open (and their fifth overall), and their tenth Grand Slam title (just one shy from the Woodies). 

They suffered early exits in Acapulco, Indian Wells and Miami but bounced back to win their 69th title in Houston. They followed this victory with their 70th title in Monte Carlo the week after. This was their 18th Masters 1000 title, tying them with Todd Woodbridge and six shy of all-time Masters 1000 leader Daniel Nestor. Their next tournament was the 2011 Barcelona Open Banco Sabadell, where they ended as runners-up to first time pairing of Santiago González and Scott Lipsky after missing four match points in a closely fought final. They continued their clay court dominance by winning (and defending) their fourth Madrid Masters title beating Michaël Llodra and Nenad Zimonjić in the final. It was the Bryans' 19th Masters title. 

Their next tournament was the Rome Masters, where they lost in the quarter-finals to compatriots Mardy Fish and Andy Roddick. They lost in the 2011 French Open semi-finals to first-time pairing of Juan Sebastián Cabal and Eduardo Schwank. They bounced back, clinching their fourth Queen's Club title, beating fellow Australian Open finalists Bhupathi/Paes in the final in a tough three-setter. They followed this up winning Wimbledon on July 2, defeating Robert Lindstedt and Horia Tecău in straight sets. This was their second Wimbledon title and tied The Woodies' record of 11 Grand Slam titles.

The brothers failed to defend their title at the Rogers Cup although they reached the final and lost to Llodra and Zimonjic in three sets. Their next stop was at the Cincinnati where they again failed to defend their title by falling to Bhupathi/Paes in the semi-finals. Their late season struggles continued at the US Open, losing in the first round. This was their first first round exit since the 2001 Australian Open. At the 2011 China Open in Beijing they were, again, unable to defend their title as they were beaten in the semi-finals by Llodra and Zimonjic in three sets. They lost the 2011 Shanghai Rolex Masters quarter-finals to Mariusz Fyrstenberg and Marcin Matkowski.

The brothers played their next tournament at the Erste Bank Open in Vienna (their first appearance there since 2002) where they re-gained some form by saving a match point in a tight first round before going on to reach the final where they defeated Max Mirnyi and Daniel Nestor in straight sets to claim their first Vienna title and their 7th title of the year (which was also their first title since Wimbledon).

They then competed in the Valencia Open 500 event in the very next week and rode their momentum without dropping a set into their first final there against Eric Butorac and Jean-Julien Rojer. They went on to win the final in straight sets to earn their first Valencia title and 8th title of the season. However, they were unable to make it three titles in three weeks at the 2011 BNP Paribas Masters as they were upset in the second round by Julien Benneteau and Nicolas Mahut. The brothers looked to finish their season strongly at the Barclays ATP World Tour Finals but lost in the semi-finals to Mirnyi and Nestor.

2012: Record breakers
The brothers began 2012 by participating at the 2012 Apia International Sydney where they reached the final. They went on to win the final by defeating wild cards Matthew Ebden and Jarkko Nieminen to claim their second title in Sydney and their 76th overall without dropping a set. The brothers then aimed to win their sixth Australian Open and reached their eighth final at the event after three consecutive three-setters which included saving a match point and overcoming a 2–5 deficit in the final set tie-break in an epic semi-final against Robert Lindstedt and Horia Tecău. However, the brothers played Leander Paes and Radek Štěpánek in the final and were upset in straight sets.

They were forced to withdraw from Indian Wells at the quarter-final stage with illness and were beaten in Miami at the semi-final stage by Paes and Štěpánek for the second time in 2012. They skipped Houston despite being the defending champions and instead secured a doubles rubber point in the USA-France Davis Cup tie at Monte-Carlo by defeating Julien Benneteau and Michaël Llodra. They then went on to win their 20th Masters 1000 title and 77th title overall at Monte Carlo without dropping a set. They had thrashed Paes and Štěpánek in the quarter-finals and comfortably beaten Max Mirnyi and Daniel Nestor in the final. However, their momentum was halted at the 2012 Barcelona Open Banc Sabadell, with their withdrawal due to illness. They took to the new blue clay of the Madrid Masters as the defending champions but lost early. Their next tournament was the Rome Masters, where they lost in the quarter-finals. 

Keen to regain some momentum, the brothers played the 2012 Open de Nice Côte d'Azur – Doubles tournament which they won for the first time by beating Oliver Marach and Filip Polášek in the final. It was their 78th title and third of the year. They then enjoyed a good run at the 2012 French Open before losing in the final to Mirnyi and Nestor. They immediately found form on the grass, reaching the final at the Queen's Club but failed to defend their title and were again defeated by Mirnyi and Nestor. The brothers reached the semi-finals of Wimbledon but, after a tight match, were defeated by eventual first-time wildcard titlists Jonathan Marray and Frederik Nielsen. After winning the Olympic gold medal at the Summer Olympics in London (see the '2012 Olympics' section below), the brothers played the 2012 Rogers Cup in Toronto. They maintained their fine form by winning their 21st Masters 1000 title and their 80th title overall after saving a match point in a closely fought final against Spaniards Marcel Granollers and Marc López.

The brothers went on to the 2012 Western & Southern Open in Cincinnati, where they lost in the semi-finals to Lindstedt and Tecău. They went on to win the 2012 US Open over Paes and Štěpánek (who had beaten the Bryans in the final of the Australian Open earlier in the year). This was the brothers' 12th major title, which meant they had surpassed the Woodies' record of 11, giving the brothers the most major titles in men's doubles in the Open Era. In November, Bob Bryan, who had missed a Davis Cup match due to the birth of his daughter, during which Mike had played with Mardy Fish, slipped behind Mike in the world rankings. This was the first time since August 2003 that the pair had had different rankings. This meant Mike Bryan finished 2012 as world No. 1 on his own.

2012 Olympics
They returned to Wimbledon for the Summer Olympics Tennis Tournament. They beat Bellucci/Sa of Brazil in the first round, Davydenko/Youzhny of Russia in the second round, Erlich/Ram of Israel in the quarterfinals, and Benneteau/Gasquet of France in the semi-finals. They entered the Gold Medal Match assured of at least a silver medal, but defeated Llodra/Tsonga of France to win the Olympic gold medal on August 4, 2012. This completed the career Golden Slam in men's doubles for the brothers, having won the Australian Open, French Open, Wimbledon, US Open and the Olympic gold medal.

2013: Non-calendar Golden Slam

The brothers started 2013 by participating at the 2013 Apia International Sydney which they won by defeating Max Mirnyi and Horia Tecău in the final to claim their third title in Sydney and their 83rd overall. The Bryans then aimed to win their sixth Australian Open. They did just that by emerging victorious in their ninth final at the event by beating the Dutch team of Robin Haase and Igor Sijsling. This gave the brothers an all-time record 13 Grand Slam titles. They surpassed the pre-Open Era record of 12 titles held by John Newcombe and Tony Roche. 

The brothers participated in the first round of the Davis Cup, where they were drawn to face Brazil in Jacksonville on indoor hard-courts. For only the third time in their career, the Bryans lost a Davis Cup doubles match when they lost in five sets to Marcelo Melo and Bruno Soares. It was their first loss of the season. However, the US would go on to win the tie 3–2 when Sam Querrey won the deciding rubber. They then played at the 2013 SAP Open in San Jose, California. It was the final edition of the tournament and therefore, the Bryans' last chance to win this tournament which had so far eluded them. However, they lost in the quarter-finals to the Australian pairing of Lleyton Hewitt and Marinko Matosevic. They bounced back immediately at the 2013 Regions Morgan Keegan Championships in Memphis. They won their third title of the season without dropping a set winning an all-American final against James Blake and Jack Sock. Following this win, Bob rejoined Mike as World No. 1. 

Their next tournament was the first Masters 1000 of the year at Indian Wells. This was the only Masters 1000 tournament that the Bryans had yet to win. The brothers rode their momentum and won the tournament after prevailing in super-tiebreakers in the quarter-final, the semi-final, and in the final against first-time pairing Treat Huey and Jerzy Janowicz. This was their 22nd Masters 1000 title, their 4th title of the year, and their 86th title as a team. Their next tournament was the 2013 Sony Ericsson Open in Miami, Florida where they lost in the first round to Max Mirnyi and Mikhail Youzhny.

The brothers then played in Boise, Idaho in the Davis Cup quarter-finals against Serbia on indoor hard-courts. However, the twins lost in five sets (15–13 in the fifth) to Nenad Zimonjić and Ilija Bozoljac. It was the first-time in their career that they had lost back-to-back Davis Cup doubles rubbers and it was their fourth loss overall in the competition. This defeat put the US 2–1 behind in rubbers. They were unable to recover and lost the tie 3–1 when Novak Djokovic beat Sam Querrey in the first reverse singles match. 

Their next tournament was Houston where they were defending champions and on a 16 match winning streak. However, their streak came to an end in the final where, despite having a match point, they were defeated by Jamie Murray and John Peers. Their next event was Monte Carlo where again, they were the defending champions. However, once again, they lost in the final after squandering seven match points against Julien Benneteau and Nenad Zimonjić. Their next event was the Madrid Masters which had reverted to red clay. The brothers reached the final against Alexander Peya and Bruno Soares. There were no missed match points this time as the Bryans closed out a comfortable win to earn their 23rd Masters 1000 title and 5th title of the year. They continued their fine run at the Rome Masters defeating Indians Mahesh Bhupathi and Rohan Bopanna in the final. It was their 88th team title, their 6th title in 2013, and their 24th Masters 1000 title. 

The brothers' clay-court form culminated in a 14th Grand Slam title at the 2013 French Open. They defeated the all-French pairing of Michaël Llodra and Nicolas Mahut in a third-set tiebreak to claim their second French Open title and 7th title of the year. It was their 89th team title and 3rd consecutive Grand Slam title.

On June 10, it was announced that the twins had qualified for the Barclays ATP World Tour Finals for the 12th time. The brothers got their grass-court campaign underway at the Queen's Club. They won their fifth Queen's Club title by defeating Peya and Soares in the final. It was their 8th title of the season and 90th title overall. They were on an 18 match winning streak going into Wimbledon. 

On July 6, the brothers achieved a historic Golden Slam as they won their 15th Grand Slam title and third Wimbledon. The twins became the second doubles team in history to hold all four majors at the same time (the only other team was the Australian duo of Ken McGregor and Frank Sedgman who achieved the Calendar Grand Slam in 1951). By defeating Ivan Dodig and Marcelo Melo in the final, they became as well as the first team to hold all four major titles and the Olympic gold medal at the same time.

The brothers withdrew from the 2013 BB&T Atlanta Open and the 2013 Citi Open in Washington citing an injury to Bob's shoulder. Their next event was the 2013 Rogers Cup in Montreal where they were the defending champions. However, their 25 match winning streak came to an end in the quarter-finals, losing to Robert Lindstedt and Daniel Nestor. At the 2013 Western & Southern Open in Cincinnati they saved a match point in the semi-finals before defeating Spaniards Marcel Granollers and Marc López in the final. It was the brothers' 10th title of 2013 and 25th Masters 1000 title. With this victory, the twins were guaranteed the year-end No. 1 team ranking for a record 9th time on August 19.

However, at the 2013 US Open, the Bryans were defeated in the semi-finals by Leander Paes and Radek Štěpánek in a rematch of the previous year's final. This loss prevented them from achieving the Calendar Grand Slam. Their next event was the Japan Open. It was the twins' first time competing in this tournament but things did not go as planned as they were defeated in their opening match by Nicolás Almagro and Pablo Cuevas. Their next tournament was the 2013 Shanghai Rolex Masters where they were beaten in the semi-finals by Dodig and Melo. The brothers played the Valencia Open where they were defeated in the final by Peya and Soares despite having 4 match points. The brothers beat Peya and Soares in the final of the 2013 BNP Paribas Masters for their 26th Masters 1000 title. Their final event was the Barclays ATP World Tour Finals where they saved a match point en route to the final before being defeated by Spaniards David Marrero and Fernando Verdasco. This loss brought to a close the greatest season of the brothers' career where they reached 15 finals, won 11 titles (including 3 majors and 5 Masters 1000 titles), and finished world No. 1 for the 9th time.

2014: Six Masters titles
The Bryan brothers began 2014 attempting to defend their title at the 2014 Apia International Sydney. However, they were upset in the quarter-finals by Lukáš Rosol and João Sousa. The brothers aimed to defend their Australian Open crown but were shocked in the third round by eventual finalists, Eric Butorac and Raven Klaasen. The twins participated in the first round of the Davis Cup where they were drawn to face Great Britain in San Diego on outdoor clay. They secured a point for the United States by winning the doubles rubber against Colin Fleming and Dominic Inglot. For Mike, it was the 35-year-old's 23rd doubles victory in the competition – the most by an American.

The brothers reached the final of the 2014 U.S. National Indoor Tennis Championships in Memphis, Tennessee but were unable to defend their title, losing again by Butorac and Klaasen. They bounced back at the 2014 Delray Beach International Tennis Championships which they won without dropping a set to claim their first title of the season. Their next tournament was the first Masters 1000 of the year at Indian Wells where the brothers successfully defended their title by defeating Alexander Peya and Bruno Soares in the final. The twins immediately followed this up by winning Miami. They defeated Juan Sebastián Cabal and Robert Farah in the final to claim their first Indian Wells-Miami double, their 28th Masters 1000 crown, and 96th title overall.

The brothers got their clay-court campaign off to a flying start by claiming their fifth Houston title defeating Spaniards David Marrero and Fernando Verdasco in a closely fought final. At Monte Carlo, the brothers won their 29th Masters 1000 crown and 4th consecutive Masters 1000 tournament by beating Ivan Dodig and Marcelo Melo in the final. This title marked their 98th title as a team and Mike's 100th doubles title. The twins had now won five consecutive tournaments and were on a 21 match winning streak. However, this streak came to an end in the final of the Madrid Masters where they were defeated by Daniel Nestor and Nenad Zimonjić. The twins' next event was the Rome Masters, where they were beaten again by Nestor and Zimonjić in the semi-finals. The brothers tried to defend their title at the 2014 French Open but were defeated in the quarter-finals by Marcel Granollers and Marc López.

The brothers began their grass-court campaign attempting to defend their title at Queens. However, they were defeated in the second round by Jamie Murray and John Peers. At Wimbledon, the Bryan brothers reached the final, where they were beaten in five sets by the doubles team of Vasek Pospisil of Canada and Jack Sock of the United States.

The brothers were then defeated in the quarter-finals of the 2014 Citi Open in Washington by Steve Johnson (tennis) and Sam Querrey. At the 2014 Rogers Cup in Toronto, they were beaten in their opening match by Marin Čilić and Santiago González. They then went on to avenge their Wimbledon final loss by defeating Pospisil and Sock in the final of the 2014 Western & Southern Open to claim their 30th Masters 1000 crown and 99th team title. The Bryans continued their winning streak at the 2014 US Open where they won their 16th major title, a record 5th US Open, and a ground-breaking 100th doubles title as a team. The twins defeated the all-Spanish pairing of Granollers and López in the final to ensure that they have now won at least won one major title per year for a record 10 consecutive years.

Having kept the United States in the World Group of the Davis Cup by beating Norbert Gombos and Lukáš Lacko in a play-off against Slovakia, the Bryan brothers did not begin the Asian swing well. Like last year, the twins were defeated in their opening match at the Japan Open- this time, by lucky losers and eventual champions Pierre-Hugues Herbert and Michał Przysiężny. However, the Bryans responded in style by winning the 2014 Shanghai Rolex Masters for the first time after defeating Roland Garros champions Julien Benneteau and Édouard Roger-Vasselin in the final. This was the twins' 31st Masters 1000 title and 101st title overall. However, most significantly, the victory meant that the Bryan brothers became the first doubles team to achieve a "Career Golden Masters" as they have now won all nine current ATP World Tour Masters 1000 tournaments. The victory meant the brothers had secured the year-end No. 1 team ranking for the sixth consecutive year and 10th time overall (both records). The Bryans continued their fine run by defeating Marcin Matkowski and Jürgen Melzer in the final of the 2014 BNP Paribas Masters to capture their 32nd Masters 1000 title. The win meant that the twins became the first players in singles or doubles to win six Masters 1000 crowns in a single season (Novak Djokovic would go on to equal this feat in the 2015 season).

At the Barclays ATP World Tour Finals, the Bryans lost their opening group match to Australian Open champions Łukasz Kubot and Robert Lindstedt. However, they rebounded by beating Jean-Julien Rojer and Horia Tecău, and Peya and Soares to qualify for the semi-finals. The twins then thrashed the all-French pairing of Benneteau and Roger-Vasselin to reach the final. In the last match of the year, the Bryans defeated Dodig and Melo to claim their fourth World Tour Finals crown and 10th title of another hugely successful season.. They would finish as the year-end No. 1 team for a 6th consecutive year and 10th overall, both records.

2015: Decline
The Bryan brothers began their year at the Heineken Open in Auckland where they were beaten in their opening match by Andre Begemann and Robin Haase after a disputed line-call when the twins were match point up. The Bryans' early season struggles continued as they were upset in the third round of the 2015 Australian Open by Dominic Inglot and Florin Mergea. It was the first time that the Bryan brothers had made consecutive pre-quarter-final exits at a major since Roland Garros (2000–2001).

They responded by successfully defending their title at the 2015 Delray Beach International Tennis Championships by defeating Raven Klaasen and Leander Paes in the final. However, their momentum was stalled in the quarter-finals of the 2015 Dubai Tennis Championships where they were beaten again by Inglot and Mergea. The twins participated in the first round of the Davis Cup where they were drawn to face Great Britain in Glasgow on indoor hard-court. Although it proved to be in vain, they kept the tie alive by winning the doubles rubber in five sets against Jamie Murray and Dominic Inglot.

The next tournament for the brothers was the first Masters 1000 of the year at Indian Wells where they were the two-time defending champions. However, their streak at the tournament was snapped in the quarter-finals by eventual champions Vasek Pospisil and Jack Sock. However, at the Miami Open they defeated Pospisil and Sock in the final to defend the title and claim their second title of the season.

The brothers got their clay-court campaign off to a slow start by losing in the quarter-finals of Houston to eventual champions Teymuraz Gabashvili and Ričardas Berankis. This was their earliest defeat at this ATP World Tour 250-level tournament since losing in the same round in 2006.

However, the Bryans responded well by successfully defending their title in Monte Carlo by defeating Australian Open champions Simone Bolelli and Fabio Fognini in the final. However, their inconsistent year continued with back-to-back second round exits at the Madrid Masters and the Rome Masters. Despite these early losses, the twins reached the final of the 2015 French Open. However, despite leading by a set and a break at one stage, the Bryans were ultimately defeated in three tight sets by Ivan Dodig and Marcelo Melo.

At Wimbledon, the Bryans were beaten in the quarter-finals by Rohan Bopanna and Florin Mergea. The Bryans began the North American hard court season in fine fashion by winning their first title in Atlanta, defeating Colin Fleming and Gilles Müller in the final. The Bryans followed this with a triumph at the 2015 Citi Open over Dodig and Melo in the final. Their momentum continued at the 2015 Rogers Cup in Montreal where they defeated Daniel Nestor and Édouard Roger-Vasselin in the final to claim a 5th title in Canada, 35th Masters 1000 title and 6th title of the season.

However, Nestor and Roger-Vasselin would defeat the Bryans in the quarter-finals of the 2015 Western & Southern Open the following week. The Bryan Brothers were stunned in the first round of the 2015 US Open by countrymen Steve Johnson and Sam Querrey. It was only their second loss in the first round of a major since 2001 and marked the first season since 2004 in which the Bryans had not won at least one major title.

The Bryan brothers began the Asian swing poorly. For the third consecutive year, they were defeated in their opening match at the Japan Open- this time, by Juan-Sebastian Cabal and Robert Farah. The twins would lose to Cabal and Farah again in their opening match at the 2015 Shanghai Rolex Masters.

On November 2, their record streak of 139 consecutive weeks at number 1 as a team came to an end as they were surpassed by Melo. It marked the first time since 9 September 2012 that neither brother had reigned in the top spot. The twins were then beaten in the quarter-finals of the 2015 BNP Paribas Masters by Pospisil and Sock.

At the Barclays ATP World Tour Finals, the Bryans lost their opening group match to Bopanna and Mergea. However, they rebounded by beating Bolelli and Fognini, and Jamie Murray and John Peers (after saving 5 match points) to qualify for the semi-finals. They then faced Jean-Julien Rojer and Horia Tecău in a match that would decide the year-end No. 1 team ranking – the Bryans were defeated in straight sets.

2016
The brothers began their year at the 2016 Apia International Sydney where they were beaten in their opening match by Jonathan Erlich and Colin Fleming. The Bryans were then upset in the third round of the 2016 Australian Open by Raven Klaasen and Rajeev Ram. The twins were beaten in their opening match at the 2016 Memphis Open by Austin Krajicek and Nicholas Monroe. The brothers reached the final of the 2016 Delray Beach International Tennis Championships but squandered six championship points before losing to Oliver Marach and Fabrice Martin. The Bryans competed in the first round of the 2016 Davis Cup World Group and gave the United States a 2–1 edge over Australia after a five-set win over Lleyton Hewitt and John Peers on the grass in Melbourne.

The brothers were beaten in the quarter-finals of Indian Wells by Édouard Roger-Vasselin and Nenad Zimonjić. The Bryans were up 9–2 in the Match Tie-break, but squandered seven match points in a row (and eight overall) before losing. The twins were unable to defend their title at the 2016 Miami Open as they were beaten in the semi-finals by eventual champions Pierre-Hugues Herbert and Nicolas Mahut.

The brothers saved two match points in their opening match and went on to defeat Víctor Estrella Burgos and Santiago González in the final to claim their sixth Houston title. This was their first title of the year and 110th overall.

Coming off their win in Houston, they looked to build on momentum. However, they failed to defend their title in Monte Carlo, losing in their opening match to Juan Sebastián Cabal and Robert Farah. The Bryans bounced back by defeating Pablo Cuevas and Marcel Granollers in the final of the 2016 Barcelona Open Banc Sabadell to claim their third Barcelona title.

At the Madrid Masters, the twins were beaten in the quarter-finals by the in-form Herbert and Mahut. Having saved three match points in their opening match, the Bryan Brothers went on to win the Rome Masters by beating Vasek Pospisil and Jack Sock in the final. This was their 36th Masters 1000 title and 112th title overall. The brothers saved one match point en route to the final of the 2016 French Open. However, they were defeated in the final by the all-Spanish pairing of Feliciano López and Marc López.

The brothers began their grass-court season at the 2016 Stuttgart Open where they were defeated in the semi-finals by Marach and Martin. At the 2016 Gerry Weber Open, the Bryans were beaten in the semi-finals by defending and eventual champions Klaasen and Ram. At Wimbledon, the twins were beaten once again by Klaasen and Ram in the quarter-finals. The Bryans began the North American hard court season attempting to defend their title at the 2016 Rogers Cup. However, they were beaten in the quarter-finals by Florin Mergea and Horia Tecău.  The brothers withdrew from the Rio Olympics because of concerns over the zica virus. The twins reached the semi-finals of the 2016 Western & Southern Open where they were defeated by Jean-Julien Rojer and Horia Tecău. The Bryans were defeated in the quarter-finals of the 2016 US Open by Feliciano López and Marc López, in the last match ever played at the old Louis Armstrong Stadium.

2019–2020: Retirement 
On November 13, 2019, the brothers announced that they would retire from professional tennis after the 2020 season, concluding with the US Open. The Bryans ultimately retired a fortnight earlier than expected, due to the negative impact of the COVID-19 pandemic on the North American hardcourt swing.

Performance timeline

Parents
The Bryan brothers' mother, Kathy Bryan (née Blake), is a former women's circuit player. She is a four-time participant at Wimbledon and made the mixed doubles quarter-finals in 1965. She still teaches tennis. Their father, Wayne, is a lawyer, musician, and tennis instructor. Both their parents are involved in various ATP Kids' Days and clinics on tour.

Personal life
The Bryan brothers are identical twins born on April 29, 1978, with Mike the elder by two minutes. Mike is 6'3" and right-handed. Bob is 6'4" and left-handed.

In their early days as junior players, they were forbidden to play each other in tournaments by their parents. If they were set to play each other in a tournament, they would alternate defaulting to the other. They graduated from Rio Mesa High School in Oxnard, California in 1996 and attended Stanford University (1996–98).

In 1998, Bob became the first player since Alex O'Brien in 1992 to win the college "Triple Crown" of NCAA singles, doubles (with Mike) and team titles. Both Bob and Mike are members of Sigma Alpha Epsilon.

Marriages
 Bob married Michelle Alvarez in December 2010; the couple resides in Sunny Isles Beach, Florida, with their three children.
 Mike is married to Nadia Murgasova, with whom he has a son, born in 2020.

Grand Slam finals

As a team

Doubles: 30 (16 titles, 14 runner-ups)

Bob individually

Mixed doubles: 9 (7 titles, 2 runner-ups)

Mike individually

Men's doubles: 2 (2 titles)

Mixed doubles: 6 (4 titles, 2 runner-ups)

Other significant finals

Year–end championships

Doubles: 6 (4 titles, 2 runner-ups)

Mike individually

Doubles: 1 (1 title)

ATP Masters 1000 finals

Doubles: 59 (39 titles, 20 runner-ups)

Olympic and Pan Am Games medals as a team

Doubles: 3 (1 gold medal, 2 bronze medals)

Mike individually

Mixed doubles: 1 (1 bronze medal)

Team competition finals

Team: 3 (1 title, 2 runner-ups)

ATP career finals

As a team

Doubles: 178 (119 titles, 59 runner-ups)

Mike individually

Doubles: 8 (5 titles, 3 runner-ups)

Davis Cup record

As a team (25–5)

Bob & Mike individually

Notes

References

External links
 
Profile on the 60 Minutes news magazine broadcast March 21, 2010

 
1978 births
Living people
American male tennis players
Australian Open (tennis) champions
French Open champions
Olympic gold medalists for the United States in tennis
Olympic bronze medalists for the United States in tennis
People from Camarillo, California
Sibling duos
Stanford Cardinal men's tennis players
Tennis players at the 2004 Summer Olympics
Tennis players at the 2008 Summer Olympics
Tennis players at the 2012 Summer Olympics
Tennis people from California
American twins
US Open (tennis) champions
Wimbledon champions
Tennis doubles teams
Twin sportspeople
Sportspeople from Ventura County, California
American identical twins
Identical twin males